Alexander "Alex" Nicholson (May 17, 1923 – June 19, 2009) was a Canadian professional ice hockey goaltender.

Career 
Nicholson led the goaltending average for the Toledo Mercurys where he played from 1948 through 1950. He played in three National Hockey League exhibition games for the New York Rangers.

Personal life 
Nicholson died in Winnipeg, Manitoba, Canada, on June 19, 2009, at the age of 86.

References

 

1923 births
2009 deaths
Canadian ice hockey goaltenders
New York Rovers players
Ice hockey people from Winnipeg
Canadian expatriate ice hockey players in the United States